Whitfield is an unincorporated community located in Jones County, Mississippi, United States.

Notes

Unincorporated communities in Jones County, Mississippi
Unincorporated communities in Mississippi